Eileen Fletcher (née King) was an international lawn bowls competitor for England.

Bowls career
In 1981 she won two gold medals in the fours with Mavis Steele, Betty Stubbings, Gloria Thomas and Irene Molyneux and team event (Taylor Trophy) and a silver medal in the triples at the 1981 World Outdoor Bowls Championship in Toronto.

She was the National Championships runner-up in 1978.

References

Date of birth missing
2019 deaths
English female bowls players
Bowls World Champions
Year of birth unknown